Giovanni Camillo Sagrestani (1660–1731) was an Italian painter of the Baroque era.

Biography
A native of Florence, he was, according to Lanzi, a pupil of Antonio Giusti, but became a follower of the style of Carlo Cignani. Sagrestani's major pupils were Matteo Bonechi (1672–1726) and Giovanni Battista Ranieri del Pace. Four canvases attributed to Sagrestani can be found in the church of Santa Maria della Fraternità in Foiano della Chiana. He also executed works in the church of San Frediano in Cestello, in the Oltrarno district of Florence. Paintings in the church of SS. Annunziata in San Giovanni Valdarno are attributed to Sagrestani. An Assumption of the Virgin is found in Nancy, France . Among his pupils was Giuseppe Moriani.

References

Tassi, Roberto, Chiesa di Santa Maria de’ Ricci già Madonna de’ Ricci..., c1998

External links

Self-portrait

1660 births
1731 deaths
17th-century Italian painters
Italian male painters
18th-century Italian painters
Painters from Florence
Italian Baroque painters
18th-century Italian male artists